The men's K-2 1000 metres event was a pairs kayaking event conducted as part of the Canoeing at the 1980 Summer Olympics program.

Medalists

Results

Heats
19 crews entered in three heats on July 31, but three did not start. The top three finishers from each of the heats advanced directly to the semifinals. The remaining seven teams were relegated to the repechage heats.

Repechages
Taking place on July 31, the top three competitors in each of the two repechages advanced to the semifinals.

Semifinals
The top three finishers in each of the three semifinals (raced on August 2) advanced to the final.

Final
The final was held on August 2.

References
1980 Summer Olympics official report Volume 3. p. 187. 
Sports-reference.com 1980 K-2 1000 m results.

Men's K-2 1000
Men's events at the 1980 Summer Olympics